Yu Lianquan (1900–1967), also known by his stage name  was a Peking opera singer.


Life
Yu was best known for his performance of female roles (dan). He served as a mentor to Li Yuru.

References

Citations

Bibliography
 .

1900 births
1967 deaths
20th-century Chinese  male singers
20th-century Chinese male actors
Chinese male Peking opera actors
People from Hengshui
Male actors from Hebei
Singers from Hebei
Female impersonators in Peking opera